China Airlines Flight 204 was a Boeing 737-200 that crashed into a mountain after takeoff from Hualien Airport, Taiwan on 26 October 1989. The crash killed all 54 passengers and crew on board the aircraft.

Aircraft
The aircraft was a Boeing 737-209, registration B-180, which first flew on 3 December 1986 and was delivered to the airline two weeks later.

Accident
Flight 204 departed Hualien Airport on a short-haul domestic flight to Chiang Kai-shek International Airport (now Taoyuan International Airport) on the island of Taiwan with 47 passengers and seven crewmembers aboard. All 54 passengers and crewmembers were killed.

Cause
The major cause of the crash was determined to be pilot error, as the experienced pilot (15 years with China Airlines) and a novice copilot departed from the wrong runway, a mistake compounded by ground-control personnel who failed to spot the error. The aircraft then flew the climb-out procedure for the correct runway, and as a result, the aircraft made a left turn toward the mountains rather than a right turn toward the sea.

See also
Singapore Airlines Flight 006
Comair Flight 5191
Western Airlines Flight 2605

References

Aviation accidents and incidents in 1989
Aviation accidents and incidents in Taiwan
Accidents and incidents involving the Boeing 737 Original
Airliner accidents and incidents caused by pilot error
Airliner accidents and incidents involving controlled flight into terrain
204
1989 in Taiwan
October 1989 events in Asia